Lars Ingemar Thomas Strand (born 1954) is a Swedish politician and former member of the Riksdag, the national legislature. A member of the Social Democratic Party, he represented Jönköping County between October 2006 and September 2018, and in September 2020. He has been a substitute member of the Riksdag for Martin Nilsson twice: October 2002 to December 2002 and August 2005 to September 2005.

Strand is the son of pastor Ingemar Strand and care assistant Sonia Strand (née Nord). He was educated in Värnamo and studied theology in Kumla. He was a member of the municipal council in Vaggeryd Municipality from 1992 to 2010.

References

1954 births
Living people
Members of the Riksdag 2006–2010
Members of the Riksdag 2010–2014
Members of the Riksdag 2014–2018
Members of the Riksdag 2018–2022
Members of the Riksdag from the Social Democrats
People from Vaggeryd Municipality